The 2018 Women's County One-Day Championship was the 22nd cricket Women's County Championship season. It ran from the beginning of May to the beginning of June and saw 33 county teams and teams representing Scotland, Wales and the Netherlands compete in a series of divisions. Hampshire Women won the County Championship as winners of the top division with Yorkshire finishing runners-up. The Championship was Hampshire's first and was achieved in their first season in the top division.

The tournament was followed by the 2018 Women's Twenty20 Cup and then by the 2018 Women's Cricket Super League, a professional tournament competed for by franchise teams.

Competition format 
Teams played matches within a series of divisions with the winners of the top division being crowned County Champions. Matches were played using a one day format with 50 overs per side.

The championship works on a points system with positions within the divisions being based on the average points of completed games. Points were awarded as follows:

Win: 10 points + bonus points. 
Tie: 5 points + bonus points. 
Loss: Bonus points.
Abandoned or cancelled: Match not counted to average.
Conceded: -5 points for the side conceding, 10 points for their opponent.

Bonus points are collected for batting and bowling. The bonus points for each match are retained if the match is completed.

Batting

1.50 runs per over (RPO) or more: 1 point
2 RPO or more: 2 points
3 RPO or more: 3 points
4 RPO or more: 4 points

Bowling

3-4 wickets taken: 1 point
5-6 wickets taken: 2 points
7-8 wickets taken: 3 points
9-10 wickets taken: 4 points

Teams 
The 2018 Championship was divided into three divisions: Division One and Division Two with eight teams each, and Division Three with 20 teams divided into five groups of four teams.

Teams in Division One and Two played each other once, while teams in each group of Division Three played each other twice.

Division One 

As of 3 June 2018 — Source: ECB Women's County Championship

Division Two 

As of 3 June 2018 — Source: ECB Women's County Championship

Division Three

Group A 

As of 28 May 2018 — Source: ECB Women's County Championship

Group B 

As of 28 May 2018 — Source: ECB Women's County Championship

Group C 

As of 28 May 2018 — Source: ECB Women's County Championship

Group D 

As of 28 May 2018 — Source: ECB Women's County Championship

Group E 

As of 28 May 2018 — Source: ECB Women's County Championship

Promotion play-offs 
Each of the teams finishing first in the groups in Division Three qualified for a series of promotion play-offs along with Essex who finished sixth in Division Two. The three winning sides will play in Division Two in 2019.

Statistics

Most runs

Source: CricketArchive

Most wickets

Source: CricketArchive

References 

 
2018
2018 in Scottish cricket
2018 in Dutch cricket
cricket
cricket
cricket